2 Chronicles 27 is the twenty-seventh chapter of the Second Book of Chronicles the Old Testament in the Christian Bible or of the second part of the Books of Chronicles in the Hebrew Bible. The book is compiled from older sources by an unknown person or group, designated by modern scholars as "the Chronicler", and had the final shape established in late fifth or fourth century BCE. This chapter belongs to the section focusing on the kingdom of Judah until its destruction by the Babylonians under Nebuchadnezzar and the beginning of restoration under Cyrus the Great of Persia  (2 Chronicles 10 to 36). The focus of this chapter is the reign of Jotham, king of Judah.

Text
This chapter was originally written in the Hebrew language and is divided into 9 verses.

Textual witnesses
Some early manuscripts containing the text of this chapter in Hebrew are of the Masoretic Text tradition, which includes the Codex Leningradensis (1008)., and Codex Leningradensis (1008).

There is also a translation into Koine Greek known as the Septuagint, made in the last few centuries BCE. Extant ancient manuscripts of the Septuagint version include Codex Vaticanus (B; B; 4th century), and Codex Alexandrinus (A; A; 5th century).

Old Testament references
:

Jotham, king of Judah (27:1–9)
Jotham receives positive judgment for his reign (cf. 2 Kings 15), repeating the praise for Uzziah (2 Chronicles 25:2) with the addition of  'only he did not invade the temple of the LORD' (verse 2), and therefore was rewarded threefold (verses. 3–6): 
 (1) He was able to build various kinds of fortresses in Judah, as well as the upper gate of the Temple and the wall of Ophel. 
 (2) He defeated the Ammonites.
 (3) He got an extremely high tribute from the Ammonites for the period of three years. Because of Jotham's good behavior towards God, Rezin and Pekah could not threaten Judah during Jotham's reign.

Verse 1
Jotham was twenty-five years old when he began to reign, and he reigned sixteen years in Jerusalem. His mother's name was Jerushah the daughter of Zadok.
Cross references: 2 Kings 15:33; 
 "16 years": according to Thiele's chronology, Jotham started to reign at the age of 25 in co-regency with his father, Uzziah (57 years old), around April 750 BCE, and became a sole king between September 740 BCE and September 739 BCE, after Uzziah's death (68 years old). Jotham transferred the throne to his son, Ahaz, around September 735 BCE to conclude his reign for a total of 16 years. However, Jotham seems to hold some state functions until April 731 BCE, while Ahaz officially was on the throne, resulting a phrase "in the 20th year of Jothan") in the synchronization with the reign of Hosea in the kingdom of Israel (verse ), despite the official count of 16 years of Jotham's reign. Jotham died between September 732 BCE and  September 732 BCE. A royal bulla (seal) with the inscription: "Belonging to Ahaz (son of) Yehotam (=Jotham), King of Judah" was discovered and authenticated.
"Jerushah": written as "Jerusha" in 15:33.

Verse 5
He fought also with the king of the Ammonites, and prevailed against them. And the children of Ammon gave him the same year an hundred talents of silver, and ten thousand measures of wheat, and ten thousand of barley. So much did the children of Ammon pay unto him, both the second year, and the third.
 "100 talents": About 3¾ tons, or 3.4 metric tons. A talent was about 75 pounds or 34 kilograms. The term "talent" is used to translate the Hebrew word  (kikkar, meaning "circle") generally referring to "something that is round", or a 'disk-shaped weight made of the metal" and, by extension, to a standard unit of weight.
 "Measures" from Hebrew kor or cor, each was about 6 bushels or 220 liters.

See also

Related Bible parts: 2 Kings 15,  2 Chronicles 26

Notes

References

Sources

 
 Thiele, Edwin R., The Mysterious Numbers of the Hebrew Kings, (1st ed.; New York: Macmillan, 1951; 2d ed.; Grand Rapids: Eerdmans, 1965; 3rd ed.; Grand Rapids: Zondervan/Kregel, 1983).

External links
 Jewish translations:
 Divrei Hayamim II - II Chronicles - Chapter 27 (Judaica Press) in Hebrew and English translation [with Rashi's commentary] at Chabad.org
 Christian translations:
 Online Bible at GospelHall.org (ESV, KJV, Darby, American Standard Version, Bible in Basic English)
 2 Chronicles Chapter 27. Bible Gateway

27